Beneath the Surface is a 2007 American horror comedy film written and directed by Blake Reigle.  It stars Kyle Stanley as a high school student who uses voodoo to resurrect his crush, played by Dominique Geisendorff, when she dies.

Plot 
High school senior Ethan has a crush on his childhood friend, Kahlah.  Ethan believes that Kahlah's boyfriend, Shane, is dangerous, but he does not know how to tell her without seeming to be crazy.  Annoyed by her reluctance to have sex with him, Shane drugs and accidentally kills Kahlah.  Convinced that Shane is guilty, Ethan uses his anthropologist neighbor's knowledge of voodoo to raise Kahlah from the dead as a zombie so that she can help him prove Shane's guilt.

Cast 
 Kyle Stanley as Ethan
 Dominique Geisendorff as Kahlah
 Christian Munden as Eric
 Brett Lawrence as Shane
 Jerry Schumacher as Shane's father
 Gloria Grant as Angelica

Production 
Shooting took place in Irvine, California.

Release 
Beneath the Surface premiered at Seattle's True Independent Film Festival on June 3, 2007.  Well Go USA Entertainment released Beneath the Surface on DVD on October 7, 2008.

Reception 
John Latchem of Home Media Magazine wrote that the film is "somewhat unpredictable".  Steve Barton of Dread Central rated it 3.5/5 stars and praised Reigle's "raw directorial talent and great writing sensibilities".  Steve Pattee of HorrorTalk rated it 1.5/5 stars and wrote, "Surfaces story is so completely predictable, it's frightening."  Writing in The Zombie Movie Encyclopedia, Volume 2, academic Peter Dendle said, "This rough teen drama from southern California captures a gritty feel in some scenes, in part because of the limited production values, but overall fails to create a consistent mood or emotional connection."

It won best feature at the Sacramento Horror Film Festival.

References

External links 
 
 Interview with the director

2007 films
2007 horror films
2007 comedy horror films
American comedy horror films
American independent films
American supernatural horror films
American zombie comedy films
Films shot in California
Films about Voodoo
Parodies of horror
2007 comedy films
2000s English-language films
2000s American films